Jatin Wadhwan (born 15 September 1994) is an Indian cricketer. He made his Twenty20 debut for Jammu & Kashmir in the 2015–16 Syed Mushtaq Ali Trophy on 10 January 2016. He made his List A debut for Jammu & Kashmir in the 2017–18 Vijay Hazare Trophy on 8 February 2018. He made his first-class debut on 17 February 2022, for Jammu and Kashmir in the 2021–22 Ranji Trophy.

References

External links
 

1994 births
Living people
Indian cricketers
Jammu and Kashmir cricketers
People from Jammu